These are some of the developments which were scheduled for construction on various islands of The World in Dubai, United Arab Emirates. However the construction was halted due to the Financial crisis of 2007–2010, except for one island gifted to race car driver Michael Schumacher by the ruler of Dubai, Mohammed bin Rashid Al Maktoum.

Islands on The World were intended to fall into several categories:

 Low density: residential islands
 Medium and high density: residential areas.
 Resorts: mainly hotels and resorts.
 Commercial: shopping, entertainment, restaurants, cafes
 Transportation: hubs for transportation by boat to mainland Dubai.

References

External links
Dubaifaqs.com
theworld.ae

Private islands of Asia
Artificial islands of Dubai